Piergiorgio Silvano Nesti (11 February 1931 – 13 December 2009) was an Italian Roman Catholic archbishop.

Ordained on 30 August 1959, Nesti was appointed archbishop of the Roman Catholic Archdiocese of Camerino-San Severino Marche on 23 July 1993 and was ordained bishop on 30 August 1993. On 27 November 1996, Pope John Paul II appointed Nesti Secretary of the Congregation for Institutes of Consecrated Life and Societies of Apostolic Life.  Nesti retired from this final position on 10 July 2006.

References

Bishops in le Marche
Members of the Congregation for Institutes of Consecrated Life and Societies of Apostolic Life
1931 births
2009 deaths
21st-century Italian Roman Catholic archbishops
20th-century Italian Roman Catholic archbishops